In geometry, the rectified truncated dodecahedron is a convex polyhedron, constructed as a rectified, truncated dodecahedron. It has 92 faces: 20 equilateral triangles, 60 isosceles triangles, and 12 decagons.

Topologically, the triangles corresponding to the dodecahedrons's vertices are always equilateral, although the decagons, while having equal edge lengths, do not have the same edge lengths with the equilateral triangles, having different but alternating angles, causing the other triangles to be isosceles instead.

Related polyhedra
The rectified truncated dodecahedron can be seen in sequence of rectification and truncation operations from the dodecahedron. Further truncation, and alternation operations creates two more polyhedra:

See also 
 Rectified truncated tetrahedron
 Rectified truncated octahedron
 Rectified truncated cube
 Rectified truncated icosahedron

References

 Coxeter Regular Polytopes, Third edition, (1973), Dover edition,  (pp. 145–154 Chapter 8: Truncation)
 John H. Conway, Heidi Burgiel, Chaim Goodman-Strass, The Symmetries of Things 2008,

External links 
 George Hart's Conway interpreter: generates polyhedra in VRML, taking Conway notation as input

Polyhedra